Jackson Dan Kingi Willison (born ) is a New Zealand rugby union player. His regular playing position is as a centre.

In 2012 he was selected for the Māori All Blacks end of year tour.

For 2013 Willison was initially included in the Chiefs, before being delisted by coach Dave Rennie while he sought to contract Counties-Manukau midfielder Bundee Aki. Blues coach John Kirwan acted quickly to sign Willison and move him to Auckland.

At the start of 2014, it was announced that he would leave the  after the 2014 Super Rugby season to join French Top 14 side Grenoble on a two-year contract. On 8 January 2016, Willison joined Aviva Premiership team Worcester Warriors for the 2015–16 season. On 15 January 2018, Willison signs for local rivals Bath ahead of the 2018–19 season.

At conclusion of his contract with Bath he moved to French Pro D2 club Soyaux Angoulême.

References

External links 
Blues profile
itsrugby.co.uk profile

Living people
1988 births
New Zealand rugby union players
Chiefs (rugby union) players
Blues (Super Rugby) players
Waikato rugby union players
Rugby union centres
Rugby union players from Hamilton, New Zealand
FC Grenoble players
People educated at Hamilton Boys' High School
Māori All Blacks players
New Zealand expatriate rugby union players
New Zealand expatriate sportspeople in France
Expatriate rugby union players in France
People educated at Ōtorohanga College
New Zealand expatriate sportspeople in England
Expatriate rugby union players in England
Bath Rugby players
Worcester Warriors players
Soyaux Angoulême XV Charente players